Peter Murphy may refer to:

Arts and entertainment
 Peter Murphy (broadcaster) (1923–2011), Irish radio and television broadcaster
 Peter Murphy (musician) (born 1957), British musician with the band Bauhaus
 Peter Murphy (artist) (born 1959), English Stuckist artist

Politics and law
 Peter P. Murphy (1801–1880), American politician, New York state senator
 Peter Murphy (businessman) (1853–1925), Australian politician
 Peter J. Murphy (1860–1916), American politician, Wisconsin state assemblyman
 Pete Murphy (1872–1946), American politician, North Carolina state representative and college football player
 Peter Murphy (politician) (born 1949), American politician, member of the Maryland House of Delegates
 Peter Murphy (JAG) (fl. 2000s), American lawyer and officer in the United States Marine Corps

Sports
 Peter Murphy (footballer, born 1922) (1922–1975), English footballer with Coventry City, Tottenham Hotspur and Birmingham City
 Peter Murphy (rugby league) (born 1941), Scottish rugby league footballer
 Peter Murphy (hurler) (born 1961), Irish hurler
 Peter Murphy (rower) (born 1967), Australian Olympic rower
 Peter Murphy (footballer, born 1980), Irish international footballer with Ayr United
 Peter Murphy (footballer, born 1990), English footballer with Wycombe Wanderers

Others
 Peter William Murphy (died 1976), New Zealand police officer
 Peter Murphy (executive) (born 1962), American businessman

See also
 Peta Murphy